Potentilla supina is a species of flowering plant belonging to the family Rosaceae.

Its native range is Temperate and Subtropical Northern Hemisphere, Northern and Southern Africa.

References

supina